The RS:X European Championships are international sailing regattas in the RS:X class.

Editions

Medalists

Men

Women

References

European championships in sailing
RS:X
Recurring sporting events established in 2006